General Claudio Graziano (born 22 November 1953) is an Italian Army officer who presently serves as Chairman of the European Union Military Committee.

He is a former Force Commander of the United Nations Interim Force in Lebanon (UNIFIL), serving in the position between 2007 and 2010. On 6 December 2011 he became the Chief of Staff of the Italian Army. From 28 February 2015 to 6 November 2018, Graziano served as the Chief of Defence Staff of the Italian Armed Forces.

References

 Biographical note from the United Nations Department of Public Information.

External links

Italian generals
United Nations military personnel
Living people
1953 births
Recipients of the National Order of the Cedar
Knights Commander of the Order of Merit of the Federal Republic of Germany
Italian military attachés
Chiefs of Defence Staff (Italy)
Chairmen of the European Union Military Committee